Eriopis connexa is a widespread species of ladybird beetle in South America.

Distribution
Eriopis connexa is one of the most widespread ladybird beetle of South America.

Description
Eriopis connexa has an oblong body shape. The base color dark brown to black with yellowish relatively large, separated dots. The pronotum and the elytra (wing covers) have a yellowish margin. Each elytron has three separated dots and the enlargements of the margin, the pronotum two smaller dots and two enlargements of the margin.

Eriopis connexa is a voracious predator of aphids.

References

External links

Coccinellidae
Beetles of North America
Beetles of South America
Beetles described in 1824